Aleksandr Nikolayevich Golikov (born November 26, 1952) is a Russian former ice hockey player.

Golikov played in the Soviet Championship League for Khimik Voskresensk and Dynamo Moscow.  He also played for the Soviet Union national ice hockey team and was a member of the 1980 Winter Olympics team in Lake Placid, winning a silver medal.  He was the top Soviet goal scorer at the games, scoring a hat trick in the first game against Japan.

He often played alongside his younger brother Vladimir Golikov who also played in the 1980 Olympics for the Soviet Union.

External links
 
 Russian and Soviet Hockey Hall of Fame bio

1952 births
HC Dynamo Moscow players
HC Khimik Voskresensk players
Ice hockey players at the 1980 Winter Olympics
Living people
Medalists at the 1980 Winter Olympics
Olympic ice hockey players of the Soviet Union
Olympic medalists in ice hockey
Olympic silver medalists for the Soviet Union
Soviet ice hockey forwards